Present: You (stylized as Present: YOU) is the third Korean studio album by the South Korean boy band Got7. It was released on September 17, 2018 under the label of JYP Entertainment. It features the single "Lullaby" in four different languages (Korean, English, Chinese and Spanish) as well as solo tracks co-produced by each member.

The album was certified platinum by Gaon Chart on November 8, 2018, after selling over 250,000 copies.

On December 3, 2018, it was reissued as a repackage album titled Present: You & Me Edition.

Background and release
Present: You was first announced on August 24, 2018 at the end of an epilogue film during Got7's Eyes On You World Tour. It was later confirmed that they would release their third studio album on September 17. According to JYP, "the new album carries a meaning that the best present of the life of Got7 is you, the fans."

On August 29, two group teaser images were unveiled, followed by the track list on August 30 and unit teasers from August 31 to September 2.

On November 16, JYP Entertainment announced the release of a repackaged album set for December 3. The re-release features new title track "Miracle" and 11 other new tracks, as well as songs from the original release.

Composition
Tamar Herman of Billboard described "Lullaby" as follows: "A funky house and synth-pop hybrid, the track bounces around between groovy verses before exploding with its bass-heavy chorus, creating a modern-day 'Lullaby' as the group's vocalists let loose with soaring belts, especially Youngjae, Jinyoung and JB."

She also described "Miracle" as "a gentle, piano-based pop ballad built for the season, a smooth carol featuring Christmastime bells and sweet strings over which the members sing and rap, showing off their harmonizing."

Jeff Benjamin of Billboard defined "Lullaby", "Enough" and "I Am Me" as "some of the septet's most ambitious and complex tracks to date."

Music videos
Music videos of Jackson, BamBam, Youngjae, Jinyoung, Yugyeom, JB and Mark's solo songs were released on a daily basis at 6PM (KST) from September 7 to September 13, 2018. The teaser video of "Lullaby" was released a few hours before Mark's music video.

The music video of "Lullaby" was released on September 17, gaining 10 million views in 24 hours. New videos were released for every five million views gained on the "Lullaby" video, until the 50 million view point. These videos included solo music video switches and various versions of the "Lullaby" dance practice.

Promotions
On September 16, all seven members were guests on SBS's Running Man show, their first appearance on the show since September 2016. They also held a "Countdown Live" show on Naver's V Live broadcasting site where they talked about their new tracks. On September 17, Got7 held a press conference before the album release. The same day, a comeback show hosted by Mnet was broadcast. Got7 is the third boy band to have their own show, after BTS and Wanna One. During the recording on September 12, they performed their new title track "Lullaby" as well as old tracks. On September 19, the group appeared as guests on JTBC's Idol Room to promote the album, making their debut on the show. On September 28, they appeared for the first time on KBS2's You Hee-yeol's Sketchbook.

Got7 held their comeback stage on Mnet's M Countdown on September 20 and promoted "Lullaby" and "I Am Me" on several music programs in South Korea, including Music Bank, Show! Music Core and Inkigayo.

Track listing

Present: You & Me Edition 
New songs are featured on CD 1; CD 2 is the same as Present: You.

Charts

Weekly charts

Year-end charts

Singles
"Lullaby"

Awards

Music programs

Release history

See also
 List of K-pop songs on the Billboard charts
 List of K-pop albums on the Billboard charts
 List of Gaon Album Chart number ones of 2018

References

2018 albums
Korean-language albums
Got7 albums
JYP Entertainment albums
IRiver albums